The 2014 Singapore Slammers season (officially the 2014 DBS Singapore Slammers season pursuant to a sponsorship agreement with DBS Bank Ltd) is the inaugural season of the franchise playing in the International Premier Tennis League (IPTL).

Season recap

Founding of franchise
On 21 January 2014, IPTL announced that one of the charter franchises for the league's inaugural 2014 season would be in Singapore. The team was founded by Indian cricket legend Sunil Gavaskar and international business executives Kishan Gehlot, Shashi Kiran Shetty and Ajay Sethi. Gehlot is the chairman of East African real estate development and healthcare conglomerate Intex Group. Shetty is chairman of Allcargo Logistics Limited. Sethi is chairman of Channel 2 in Dubai. They collectively invested US$15 million to own the franchise.

Inaugural draft
The Singapore franchise participated in the IPTL inaugural draft on 2 March 2014, in Dubai, United Arab Emirates. Players selected by Singapore were

Team name
By May 2014, the team was being referred to as the Singapore Lions. By June 2014, the Lions had become known as the Singapore Slammers.

Home venue
On 4 August 2014, the Slammers announced that their home matches would be played at Singapore Indoor Stadium.

First coach
On 27 October 2014, Joshua Eagle was named the Slammers' first coach.

Event chronology
 21 January 2014: IPTL announced that one of the charter franchises for the league inaugural 2014 season would be in Singapore.
 2 March: The Singapore franchise participated in the IPTL inaugural draft.
 10 May: The Singapore franchise was referred to as the Singapore Lions.
 25 June: The Lions' name is changed to the Singapore Slammers.
 4 August: The Slammers announced that their home matches would be played at Singapore Indoor Stadium.
 27 October: Joshua Eagle was named the Slammers' first coach.
 28 November: The Indian Aces defeated the Slammers 26–16 in the first match in IPTL history.

Match log

Roster
Reference:
  Andre Agassi
  Tomáš Berdych
  Daniela Hantuchová
  Lleyton Hewitt
  Nick Kyrgios
  Patrick Rafter
  Bruno Soares
  Serena Williams
  Joshua Eagle - Coach

Television coverage
Television coverage in Singapore of Slammers matches will be provided by SingTel.

Sponsorship
On 20 November 2014, DBS Bank Ltd announced that it had become the Slammers' title sponsor.

See also

References

External links
Singapore Slammers official website
International Premier Tennis League official website

Slammers 2014
Singapore Slammers season
2014 in Singaporean sport